— Thomas Gray, Elegy Written in a Country Church-Yard, published this year

Nationality words link to articles with information on the nation's poetry or literature (for instance, Irish or France).

Events
 Christopher Smart wins the Seatonian Prize for the second year in a row. He will also win the prize in 1753 and 1755.

Works published

United Kingdom
 Richard Owen Cambridge, The Scribleriad, in six books, first published separately from January through March
 Thomas Cooke, An Ode on the Powers of Poetry, published anonymously
 Nathaniel Cotton, Visions in Verse, published anonymously, a verse version for children of Gay's Fables 1727
 Thomas Gray, Elegy Written in a Country Church-Yard, published anonymously, a literary sensation published February 15 by Robert Dodsley in a quarto pamphlet with a preface by Horace Walpole (reprinted in Designes by Mr. R. Bentley 1753 and in Gray's Poems 1768); an important work of the Graveyard poets movement
 Mary Leapor, Poems Upon several Occasions, edited by Samuel Richardson and Isaac Hawkins, published posthumously (see also Poems upon Several Occasions 1748
 Moses Mendes, The Seasons
 Alexander Pope, The Works of Alexander Pope, edited by William Warburton, published posthumously

Switzerland, German language
 Johann Jakob Bodmer:
 Die Sundflutz, an epic
 Noah, an epic
 Solomon Gessner, Lied eines Schweizers an sein bewaffnetes Madchen, German-language work published in Switzerland

Other
 Christoph Martin Wieland, Nature of Things, alexandrine verse, in six books; Germany

Births
Death years link to the corresponding "[year] in poetry" article:
 January 22 – David Richards (Dafydd Ionawr) (died 1827), Welsh poet
 February 20 – Johann Heinrich Voss (died 1826), German poet
 October 15 – David Samwell (Dafydd Ddu Feddyg) (died 1798), Welsh naval surgeon and poet
 October 30 – Richard Brinsley Sheridan (died 1816), Irish playwright, poet, speechwriter and Whig politician
 Probable date – Mary Scott (died 1793), English poet
 Approximate date – Henrietta Battier (died 1813), Irish poet, satirist and actress

Deaths
Birth years link to the corresponding "[year] in poetry" article:
 April 19 – John Bancks (Banks) (born 1709), English poet and author
 May 24 – William Hamilton (born 1665?), Scottish comic poet
 October 26 – Philip Doddridge (born 1702), English Nonconformist preacher and writer

See also

Poetry
List of years in poetry

Notes

18th-century poetry
Poetry